Dick Lowrie (born 7 July 1943) is a Scottish retired amateur footballer who played as an inside forward in the Scottish League for Stenhousemuir.

Personal life 
Lowrie worked for the Inland Revenue.

Honours 
Cambuslang Rangers
 Scottish Junior Cup: 1970–71, 1971–72

References

1943 births
Scottish footballers
Brentford F.C. players
St Roch's F.C. players
Scottish Football League players
Stenhousemuir F.C. players
Association football inside forwards
Living people
Petershill F.C. players
Cambuslang Rangers F.C. players